Riccardo Fellini ( 21 February 1921 - 26 March 1991) was an Italian film actor. He also worked as a director on documentaries for RAI. He was the brother of the director Federico Fellini and starred in his 1953 film I Vitelloni. His younger sister was the actress Maddalena Fellini.

Filmography

References

Bibliography
 Mitchell, Charles P. The Great Composers Portrayed on Film, 1913 through 2002. McFarland, 2004.

External links

1921 births
1991 deaths
Italian television directors
Italian male film actors
People from Rimini
Riccardo